Tuvalu participates in the Pacific Games which is a multi-sport event with participation exclusively from countries in Oceania. Known as the South Pacific Games prior to 2009, the games are currently held every four years. 

Tuvalu made its first appearance at the 1979 South Pacific Games held in Suva, Fiji. Telupe Iosefa received the first ever gold medal won by Tuvalu at the 2015 Pacific Games in the powerlifting 120 kg male division.

Tuvalu also participates in the Pacific Mini Games, which is a scaled-down version of the main games that enable smaller nations to host events and compete against each other and which is similarly rotated on a four-year basis in the intervening years between the main games.

History of participation by Tuvaluan athletes
A combined Gilbert and Ellice Islands team participated at the 1963, 1966, and 1971 South Pacific Games.  An athlete from Tuvalu (then Ellice Islands), namely Nelu Arenga, is at least documented for 1971.

Athletes from Tuvalu attended the 2003 South Pacific Games for the first time.

Logona Esau was the first athlete from Tuvalu to win a medal at an international competition, when he took bronze at the 2005 South Pacific Mini Games in Koror, Palau.

Tuvalu competed at the 2007 Pacific Games in Apia, Samoa. Tuvalu was ranked 18th equal at the Games, with 2 medals (0 gold - 1 silver - 1 bronze).

Tuvalu competed at the 2011 Pacific Games in Nouméa, New Caledonia. Tuvalu was ranked 17th at the Games, with 3 medals (0 gold - 2 silver - 1 bronze).

At the 2013 Pacific Mini Games in Mata-Utu, Wallis and Futuna, Tuau Lapua Lapua won Tuvalu's first ever gold medal in an international competition in the weightlifting 62 kilogram male snatch. (He also won bronze in the clean and jerk, and obtained the silver medal overall for the combined event.)

Tuvalu competed at the 2015 Pacific Games in Port Moresby, Papua New Guinea. Nakibae Kitisane was the Chef de Mission. Tuvalu was ranked 19th at the Games, with 4 medals (1 gold - 0 silver - 3 bronze). Telupe Iosefa received the first ever gold medal won by Tuvalu at the Pacific Games in the powerlifting 120 kg male division.

Tuvalu competed at the 2017 Pacific Mini Games held at Port Vila, Vanuatu, winning 2 medals (0 gold - 1 silver - 1 bronze). The team included Asenate Manoa (women’s long jump), Meauma Petaia (men’s long jump), Imo Fiamalua (men’s javelin throw), Vaiuli Nukualofa (men’s javelin throw), Tupou Koliano, Vaiuli Nukualofa, Meauma Petaia and Karalo Maibuca (men’s 100 metres & 4 x 100 metres relay), Ioane Hawaii (men's table tennis) and Manuila Raobu (men's weightlifting). 

 Ioane Hawaii participated in the men’s seated singles table tennis event, winning a silver medal.
 Manuila Raobu participated in the men’s 62 kg weightlifting snatch event, winning a bronze medal.
 The Tuvaluan football team placed 4th in the men’s competition with 2 wins and 3 losses.
 Imo Fiamalua placed 8th in the men’s javelin throw event and set a Tuvaluan national record of 53.62 metres.
 Tupou Koliano, Vaiuli Nukualofa, Meauma Petaia and Karalo Maibuca placed 6th in the 4 x 100 m relay and set a Tuvaluan national record of 46.07 seconds.

Tuvalu competed at the 2019 Pacific Games in Apia, Samoa. Tuvalu was ranked 20th at the Games, with 3 medals (1 gold - 1 silver - 1 bronze).

Pacific Games medals
 Logona Esau in Weightlifting at the 2007 Pacific Games:  69 kg Clean & Jerk.  
 Iliala Fakatokaga in Boxing at the 2007 Pacific Games:  Heavy-weight 91 kg division.  
 Tuau Lapua Lapua in Weightlifting at the 2011 Pacific Games:  62 kg Clean & Jerk,  62 kg Snatch,  62 kg Total.
 Telupe Iosefa in Powerlifting at the 2015 Pacific Games:  120 kg Male division.
 Asenate Manoa in Powerlifting at the 2015 Pacific Games:  72 kg Female division.  
 Teofoga Edueni Sonya Dabwido in Powerlifting at the 2015 Pacific Games:  84 kg Female division.
 Harry Dave Eti Esela in Boxing at the 2015 Pacific Games:  Heavy-weight 82–91 kg division.
 Ioane Hawaii in Table tennis at the 2019 Pacific Games:  Men's Seated Singles event.
 Telupe Iosefa in Powerlifting at the 2019 Pacific Games:  120 kg male division. 
 Fiu Tui in Boxing at the 2019 Pacific Games:  Men's Middle Weight 75 kg division.

Participation of the Tuvalu national football team

Tuvalu have appeared in the finals of the football competition at the Pacific Games on four occasions in 1979, 2003, 2007 and 2011. The football team did not participated in the 2015 Pacific Games.

Record

Tuvalu national football team at the 1979 South Pacific Games

Group 2

Quarter finals

Consolation Tournament (5th-12th place)

Semi finals

Tuvalu national football team at the 2003 South Pacific Games

Group A

Tuvalu national football team at the 2007 Pacific Games

Group A

Tuvalu national football team at the 2011 Pacific Games

Group A

Tuvalu national football team at the 2019 Pacific Games

References